Bruno Martella (born 14 August 1992) is an Italian footballer who plays for Serie B club Ternana.

Biography

Pescara
Born in Atri, Abruzzo, Martella started his career at Abruzzo team Real Madrid CF. He was the member of Giovanissimi Provincial U14 team "A" in 2005–06 season. Martella was a member of Allievi A U17 team in 2008–09 season and lastly for the reserve from 2009 to January 2012. Martella played in Berretti Reserve League in 2009–10 and Primavera Reserve League from 2010 to January 2012 after the first team promoted to Serie B.  He also spent 6 months with Sampdoria's reserve after the club signed Martella in co-ownership deal for €250,000 in -year contract. The co-ownership deal was renewed in June 2011 and Martella returned to Pescara in temporary deal, along with Loris Bacchetti on 1 July 2011.

Martella wore no.42 and no.16 for the first team in 2010–11 Serie B and 2011–12 Serie B respectively. However, he failed to make any debut, despite Martella received call-up. On 20 January 2012 Martella left for Viareggio in temporary deal, with Sampdoria teammate Simone Zaza already joined on 12 January .

Martella made 8 appearances in 2011–12 Lega Pro Prima Divisione.

Sampdoria
On 21 June 2012 Sampdoria bought Martella outright and allowed Bacchetti returned to Pescara outright.

On 15 July 2012 he left for Perugia of Lega Pro Prima Divisione in temporary deal. On 25 January 2013 he was signed by Viareggio.

On 8 July 2013 he left for A.C. Pisa 1909 of Lega Pro Prima Divisione in temporary deal.

Crotone
On 8 July 2014 he was sold to Serie B club Crotone in 3-year contract.

Brescia
On 31 January 2019, he joined Brescia on loan. At the end of the season, Brescia decided to redeem the player and he penned a 3-year contract with the club.

Ternana
On 23 August 2021, he signed a three-year contract with Ternana.

Career statistics

References

External links
 
 Football.it Profile 

1992 births
Living people
Italian footballers
Delfino Pescara 1936 players
U.C. Sampdoria players
F.C. Esperia Viareggio players
Pisa S.C. players
F.C. Crotone players
Brescia Calcio players
Ternana Calcio players
Serie A players
Serie B players
Serie C players
Association football defenders
Sportspeople from the Province of Teramo
Footballers from Abruzzo